Miguel Ângelo da Cruz Simão (born 26 February 1973) is a Portuguese retired professional footballer who played mainly as a forward.

Football career
Born in Porto, Simão successfully emerged through local Boavista FC's youth system, making his professional debuts in the Segunda Liga with C.D. Nacional and joining another club in that division, C.D. Feirense, in the following season. He first competed in the Primeira Liga with S.C. Salgueiros, playing in 22 games in 1993–94 as his team finished in 11th position (five goals scored).

Simão spent most of the following four years in the second level, the exception being the 1996–97 campaign with Salgueiros. In the 1998 summer he joined Scottish club St Johnstone, making his debut on 29 August in a 0–4 loss against Rangers at Ibrox Stadium, which proved to be manager Paul Sturrock's final game in charge; he played in 26 Premier League matches in his first year, netting four times.

Three days shy of celebrating one year since playing his first game for the Saints, Simão scored two late goals as a substitute against Vaasan Palloseura in the UEFA Cup, in a playoff round 2–0 home win (3–1 on aggregate). After a few months in J1 League with Sanfrecce Hiroshima, he returned to Portugal for a further two-and-a-half seasons with three clubs, appearing with Gil Vicente F.C. in the top flight.

References

External links

1973 births
Living people
Footballers from Porto
Portuguese footballers
Association football forwards
Primeira Liga players
Liga Portugal 2 players
Segunda Divisão players
Boavista F.C. players
C.D. Nacional players
C.D. Feirense players
S.C. Salgueiros players
Associação Académica de Coimbra – O.A.F. players
C.D. Aves players
Gil Vicente F.C. players
Moreirense F.C. players
AD Fafe players
Scottish Premier League players
St Johnstone F.C. players
J1 League players
Sanfrecce Hiroshima players
Portugal youth international footballers
Portugal under-21 international footballers
Portuguese expatriate footballers
Expatriate footballers in Scotland
Expatriate footballers in Japan
Expatriate footballers in Germany
Expatriate footballers in Luxembourg
Portuguese expatriate sportspeople in Scotland
Portuguese expatriate sportspeople in Japan